Norman Frederick Nielson (6 November 1928 – 1 January 2002) was a South African professional footballer who played as a centre half.

Career
Born in Johannesburg, Nielson played for Arcadia Shepherds, Charlton Athletic, Derby County, Bury, Hull City, Corby Town, Gresley Rovers, Hinckley Athletic, Long Eaton United and Ripley Miners Welfare. He was one of three South African footballers to play for Hull City in the 1950s, the others being Alf Ackerman and Neil Cubie.

References

1928 births
2002 deaths
South African soccer players
Arcadia Shepherds F.C. players
Charlton Athletic F.C. players
Derby County F.C. players
Bury F.C. players
Hull City A.F.C. players
Corby Town F.C. players
Gresley F.C. players
Hinckley Athletic F.C. players
Long Eaton United F.C. players
Ripley Town F.C. players
English Football League players
Association football defenders
South African expatriate soccer players
South African expatriate sportspeople in England
Expatriate footballers in England
Soccer players from Johannesburg